The mathematical formulations of quantum mechanics are those mathematical formalisms that permit a rigorous description of quantum mechanics. This mathematical formalism uses mainly a part of functional analysis, especially Hilbert spaces, which are a kind of linear space. Such are distinguished from mathematical formalisms for physics theories developed prior to the early 1900s by the use of abstract mathematical structures, such as infinite-dimensional Hilbert spaces (L2 space mainly), and operators on these spaces. In brief, values of physical observables such as energy and momentum were no longer considered as values of functions on phase space, but as eigenvalues; more precisely as spectral values of linear operators in Hilbert space.

These formulations of quantum mechanics continue to be used today. At the heart of the description are ideas of quantum state and quantum observables, which are radically different from those used in previous models of physical reality. While the mathematics permits calculation of many quantities that can be measured experimentally, there is a definite theoretical limit to values that can be simultaneously measured. This limitation was first elucidated by Heisenberg through a thought experiment, and is represented mathematically in the new formalism by the non-commutativity of operators representing quantum observables.

Prior to the development of quantum mechanics as a separate theory, the mathematics used in physics consisted mainly of formal mathematical analysis, beginning with calculus, and increasing in complexity up to differential geometry and partial differential equations. Probability theory was used in statistical mechanics. Geometric intuition played a strong role in the first two and, accordingly, theories of relativity were formulated entirely in terms of differential geometric concepts. The phenomenology of quantum physics arose roughly between 1895 and 1915, and for the 10 to 15 years before the development of quantum mechanics (around 1925) physicists continued to think of quantum theory within the confines of what is now called classical physics, and in particular within the same mathematical structures. The most sophisticated example of this is the Sommerfeld–Wilson–Ishiwara quantization rule, which was formulated entirely on the classical phase space.

History of the formalism

The "old quantum theory" and the need for new mathematics 

In the 1890s, Planck was able to derive the blackbody spectrum, which was later used to avoid the classical ultraviolet catastrophe by making the unorthodox assumption that, in the interaction of electromagnetic radiation with matter, energy could only be exchanged in discrete units which he called quanta. Planck postulated a direct proportionality between the frequency of radiation and the quantum of energy at that frequency. The proportionality constant, is now called Planck's constant in his honor.

In 1905, Einstein explained certain features of the photoelectric effect by assuming that Planck's energy quanta were actual particles, which were later dubbed photons.

All of these developments were phenomenological and challenged the theoretical physics of the time. Bohr and Sommerfeld went on to modify classical mechanics in an attempt to deduce the Bohr model from first principles. They proposed that, of all closed classical orbits traced by a mechanical system in its phase space, only the ones that enclosed an area which was a multiple of Planck's constant were actually allowed. The most sophisticated version of this formalism was the so-called Sommerfeld–Wilson–Ishiwara quantization. Although the Bohr model of the hydrogen atom could be explained in this way, the spectrum of the helium atom (classically an unsolvable 3-body problem) could not be predicted. The mathematical status of quantum theory remained uncertain for some time.

In 1923, de Broglie proposed that wave–particle duality applied not only to photons but to electrons and every other physical system.

The situation changed rapidly in the years 1925–1930, when working mathematical foundations were found through the groundbreaking work of Erwin Schrödinger, Werner Heisenberg, Max Born, Pascual Jordan, and the foundational work of John von Neumann, Hermann Weyl and Paul Dirac, and it became possible to unify several different approaches in terms of a fresh set of ideas. The physical interpretation of the theory was also clarified in these years after Werner Heisenberg discovered the uncertainty relations and Niels Bohr introduced the idea of complementarity.

The "new quantum theory" 

Werner Heisenberg's matrix mechanics was the first successful attempt at replicating the observed quantization of atomic spectra. Later in the same year, Schrödinger created his wave mechanics. Schrödinger's formalism was considered easier to understand, visualize and calculate as it led to differential equations, which physicists were already familiar with solving. Within a year, it was shown that the two theories were equivalent.

Schrödinger himself initially did not understand the fundamental probabilistic nature of quantum mechanics, as he thought that the absolute square of the wave function of an electron should be interpreted as the charge density of an object smeared out over an extended, possibly infinite, volume of space. It was Max Born who introduced the interpretation of the absolute square of the wave function as the probability distribution of the position of a pointlike object. Born's idea was soon taken over by Niels Bohr in Copenhagen who then became the "father" of the Copenhagen interpretation of quantum mechanics. Schrödinger's wave function can be seen to be closely related to the classical Hamilton–Jacobi equation. The correspondence to classical mechanics was even more explicit, although somewhat more formal, in Heisenberg's matrix mechanics. In his PhD thesis project, Paul Dirac discovered that the equation for the operators in the Heisenberg representation, as it is now called, closely translates to classical equations for the dynamics of certain quantities in the Hamiltonian formalism of classical mechanics, when one expresses them through Poisson brackets, a procedure now known as canonical quantization.

To be more precise, already before Schrödinger, the young postdoctoral fellow Werner Heisenberg invented his matrix mechanics, which was the first correct quantum mechanics–– the essential breakthrough. Heisenberg's matrix mechanics formulation was based on algebras of infinite matrices, a very radical formulation in light of the mathematics of classical physics, although he started from the index-terminology of the experimentalists of that time, not even aware that his "index-schemes" were matrices, as Born soon pointed out to him. In fact, in these early years, linear algebra was not generally popular with physicists in its present form.

Although Schrödinger himself after a year proved the equivalence of his wave-mechanics and Heisenberg's matrix mechanics, the reconciliation of the two approaches and their modern abstraction as motions in Hilbert space is generally attributed to Paul Dirac, who wrote a lucid account in his 1930 classic The Principles of Quantum Mechanics. He is the third, and possibly most important, pillar of that field (he soon was the only one to have discovered a relativistic generalization of the theory). In his above-mentioned account, he introduced the bra–ket notation, together with an abstract formulation in terms of the Hilbert space used in functional analysis; he showed that Schrödinger's and Heisenberg's approaches were two different representations of the same theory, and found a third, most general one, which represented the dynamics of the system. His work was particularly fruitful in many types of generalizations of the field.

The first complete mathematical formulation of this approach, known as the Dirac–von Neumann axioms, is generally credited to John von Neumann's 1932 book Mathematical Foundations of Quantum Mechanics, although Hermann Weyl had already referred to Hilbert spaces (which he called unitary spaces) in his 1927 classic paper and book. It was developed in parallel with a new approach to the mathematical spectral theory based on linear operators rather than the quadratic forms that were David Hilbert's approach a generation earlier. Though theories of quantum mechanics continue to evolve to this day, there is a basic framework for the mathematical formulation of quantum mechanics which underlies most approaches and can be traced back to the mathematical work of John von Neumann. In other words, discussions about interpretation of the theory, and extensions to it, are now mostly conducted on the basis of shared assumptions about the mathematical foundations.

Later developments 

The application of the new quantum theory to electromagnetism resulted in quantum field theory, which was developed starting around 1930. Quantum field theory has driven the development of more sophisticated formulations of quantum mechanics, of which the ones presented here are simple special cases. 
 Path integral formulation
 Phase-space formulation of quantum mechanics & geometric quantization
 quantum field theory in curved spacetime
 axiomatic, algebraic and constructive quantum field theory
 C*-algebra formalism
 Generalized statistical model of quantum mechanics

A related topic is the relationship to classical mechanics. Any new physical theory is supposed to reduce to successful old theories in some approximation. For quantum mechanics, this translates into the need to study the so-called classical limit of quantum mechanics. Also, as Bohr emphasized, human cognitive abilities and language are inextricably linked to the classical realm, and so classical descriptions are intuitively more accessible than quantum ones. In particular, quantization, namely the construction of a quantum theory whose classical limit is a given and known classical theory, becomes an important area of quantum physics in itself.

Finally, some of the originators of quantum theory (notably Einstein and Schrödinger) were unhappy with what they thought were the philosophical implications of quantum mechanics. In particular, Einstein took the position that quantum mechanics must be incomplete, which motivated research into so-called hidden-variable theories. The issue of hidden variables has become in part an experimental issue with the help of quantum optics.

Postulates of quantum mechanics 
A physical system is generally described by three basic ingredients: states; observables; and dynamics (or law of time evolution) or, more generally, a group of physical symmetries. A classical description can be given in a fairly direct way by a phase space model of mechanics: states are points in a phase space formulated by symplectic manifold, observables are real-valued functions on it, time evolution is given by a one-parameter group of symplectic transformations of the phase space, and physical symmetries are realized by symplectic transformations. A quantum description normally consists of a Hilbert space of states, observables are self-adjoint operators on the space of states, time evolution is given by a one-parameter group of unitary transformations on the Hilbert space of states, and physical symmetries are realized by unitary transformations. (It is possible, to map this Hilbert-space picture to a phase space formulation, invertibly. See below.)

The following summary of the mathematical framework of quantum mechanics can be partly traced back to the Dirac–von Neumann axioms.

Description of the state of a system 
Each isolated physical system is associated with a (topologically) separable complex Hilbert space  with inner product .

Separability is a mathematically convenient hypothesis, with the physical interpretation that countably many observations are enough to uniquely determine the state. A quantum mechanical state is a ray in projective Hilbert space, not a vector. Many textbooks fail to make this distinction, which could be partly a result of the fact that the Schrödinger equation itself involves Hilbert-space "vectors", with the result that the imprecise use of "state vector" rather than ray is very difficult to avoid.

Accompanying Postulate I is the composite system postulate:

In the presence of quantum entanglement, the quantum state of the composite system cannot be factored as a tensor product of states of its local constituents; Instead, it is expressed as a sum, or superposition, of tensor products of states of component subsystems. A subsystem in an entangled composite system generally can't be described by a state vector (or a ray), but instead is described by a density operator; Such quantum state is known as a mixed state. The density operator of a mixed state is a trace class, nonnegative (positive semi-definite) self-adjoint operator  normalized to be of trace 1. In turn, any density operator of a mixed state can be represented as a subsystem of a larger composite system in a pure state (see purification theorem).

In the absence of quantum entanglement, the quantum state of the composite system is called a separable state.

Measurement on a system

Description of physical quantities 
Since these operators are Hermitian, their eigenvalues are always real, and represent the possible outcomes/results from measuring the corresponding observable. If the spectrum of the observable is discrete, then the possible results are quantized.

Results of measurement 

If the eigenvalue  has degenerate, orthonormal eigenvectors , then the projection operator onto the eigensubspace can be defined as the identity operator in the eigensubspace:

and then .

Postulates II.a and II.b are collectively known as the Born rule of quantum mechanics.

Effect of measurement on the state 

When a measurement is performed, only one result is obtained (according to some interpretations of quantum mechanics). This is modeled mathematically as the processing of additional information from the measurement, confining the probabilities of an immediate second measurement of the same observable. In the case of a discrete, non-degenerate spectrum, two sequential measurements of the same observable will always give the same value assuming the second immediately follows the first. Therefore the state vector must change as a result of measurement, and collapse onto the eigensubspace associated with the eigenvalue measured. 

Postulates II.c is sometimes called the "state update rule" or "collapse rule"; Together with the Born rule (Postulates II.a and II.b), they form a complete representation of measurements, and are sometimes collectively called the measurement postulate(s).

Note that the projection-valued measures (PVM) described in the measurement postulate(s) can be generalized to positive operator-valued measures (POVM), which is the most general kind of measurement in quantum mechanics. A POVM can be understood as the effect on a component subsystem when a PVM is performed on a larger, composite system (see Naimark's dilation theorem).

Time evolution of a system 
Though it is possible to derive the Schrödinger equation, which describes how a state vector evolves in time, most texts assert the equation as a postulate. Common derivations include using the de Broglie hypothesis or path integrals.

Equivalently, the time evolution postulate can be stated as:

The evolution of an open quantum system can be described by quantum operations (in an operator sum formalism) and quantum instruments, and generally does not have to be unitary.

Other implications of the postulates 
 Physical symmetries act on the Hilbert space of quantum states unitarily or antiunitarily due to Wigner's theorem (supersymmetry is another matter entirely).

 Density operators are those that are in the closure of the convex hull of the one-dimensional orthogonal projectors. Conversely, one-dimensional orthogonal projectors are extreme points of the set of density operators. Physicists also call one-dimensional orthogonal projectors pure states and other density operators mixed states.
 One can in this formalism state Heisenberg's uncertainty principle and prove it as a theorem, although the exact historical sequence of events, concerning who derived what and under which framework, is the subject of historical investigations outside the scope of this article.
 Recent research has shown that the composite system postulate (tensor product postulate) can be derived from the state postulate (Postulate I) and the measurement postulates (Postulates II); Moreover, it has also been shown that the measurement postulates (Postulates II) can be derived from "unitary quantum mechanics", which includes only the state postulate (Postulate I), the composite system postulate (tensor product postulate) and the unitary evolution postulate (Postulate III).

Furthermore, to the postulates of quantum mechanics one should also add basic statements on the properties of spin and Pauli's exclusion principle, see below.

Spin 

In addition to their other properties, all particles possess a quantity called spin, an intrinsic angular momentum. Despite the name, particles do not literally spin around an axis, and quantum mechanical spin has no correspondence in classical physics. In the position representation, a spinless wavefunction has position  and time  as continuous variables, . For spin wavefunctions the spin is an additional discrete variable: , where  takes the values;

That is, the state of a single particle with spin  is represented by a -component spinor of complex-valued wave functions.

Two classes of particles with very different behaviour are bosons which have integer spin, and fermions possessing half-integer spin.

Pauli's principle 

The property of spin relates to another basic property concerning systems of  identical particles: Pauli's exclusion principle, which is a consequence of the following permutation behaviour of an -particle wave function; again in the position representation one must postulate that for the transposition of any two of the  particles one always should have

In nonrelativistic quantum mechanics all particles are either bosons or fermions; in relativistic quantum theories also "supersymmetric" theories exist, where a particle is a linear combination of a bosonic and a fermionic part. Only in dimension  can one construct entities where  is replaced by an arbitrary complex number with magnitude 1, called anyons.

Although spin and the Pauli principle can only be derived from relativistic generalizations of quantum mechanics, the properties mentioned in the last two paragraphs belong to the basic postulates already in the non-relativistic limit. Especially, many important properties in natural science, e.g. the periodic system of chemistry, are consequences of the two properties.

Mathematical structure of quantum mechanics

Pictures of dynamics 

Summary:

Representations 

The original form of the Schrödinger equation depends on choosing a particular representation of Heisenberg's canonical commutation relations. The Stone–von Neumann theorem dictates that all irreducible representations of the finite-dimensional Heisenberg commutation relations are unitarily equivalent. A systematic understanding of its consequences has led to the phase space formulation of quantum mechanics, which works in full phase space instead of Hilbert space, so then with a more intuitive link to the classical limit thereof. This picture also simplifies considerations
of quantization, the deformation extension from classical to quantum mechanics.

The quantum harmonic oscillator is an exactly solvable system where the different representations are easily compared. There, apart from the Heisenberg, or Schrödinger (position or momentum), or phase-space representations, one also encounters the Fock (number) representation and the Segal–Bargmann (Fock-space or coherent state) representation (named after Irving Segal and Valentine Bargmann). All four are unitarily equivalent.

Time as an operator 

The framework presented so far singles out time as the parameter that everything depends on. It is possible to formulate mechanics in such a way that time becomes itself an observable associated with a self-adjoint operator. At the classical level, it is possible to arbitrarily parameterize the trajectories of particles in terms of an unphysical parameter , and in that case the time t becomes an additional generalized coordinate of the physical system.

This is related to the quantization of constrained systems and quantization of gauge theories. It
is also possible to formulate a quantum theory of "events" where time becomes an observable (see D. Edwards).

The problem of measurement 

The picture given in the preceding paragraphs is sufficient for description of a completely isolated system. However, it fails to account for one of the main differences between quantum mechanics and classical mechanics, that is, the effects of measurement. The von Neumann description of quantum measurement of an observable , when the system is prepared in a pure state  is the following (note, however, that von Neumann's description dates back to the 1930s and is based on experiments as performed during that time – more specifically the Compton–Simon experiment; it is not applicable to most present-day measurements within the quantum domain):

In other words, the probability is obtained by integrating the characteristic function of  against the countably additive measure 

where  is a Borel set containing only the single eigenvalue . If the system is prepared in state

Then the probability of a measurement returning the value  can be calculated by integrating the spectral measure

This gives trivially

The characteristic property of the von Neumann measurement scheme is that repeating the same measurement will give the same results. This is also called the projection postulate.

A more general formulation replaces the projection-valued measure with a positive-operator valued measure (POVM). To illustrate, take again the finite-dimensional case. Here we would replace the rank-1 projections

by a finite set of positive operators

whose sum is still the identity operator as before (the resolution of identity). Just as a set of possible outcomes  is associated to a projection-valued measure, the same can be said for a POVM. Instead of collapsing to the (unnormalized) state

after the measurement, the system now will be in the state

Since the  operators need not be mutually orthogonal projections, the projection postulate of von Neumann no longer holds.

The same formulation applies to general mixed states.

In von Neumann's approach, the state transformation due to measurement is distinct from that due to time evolution in several ways. For example, time evolution is deterministic and unitary whereas measurement is non-deterministic and non-unitary. However, since both types of state transformation take one quantum state to another, this difference was viewed by many as unsatisfactory. The POVM formalism views measurement as one among many other quantum operations, which are described by completely positive maps which do not increase the trace.

In any case it seems that the above-mentioned problems can only be resolved if the time evolution included not only the quantum system, but also, and essentially, the classical measurement apparatus (see above).

The relative state interpretation 

An alternative interpretation of measurement is Everett's relative state interpretation, which was later dubbed the "many-worlds interpretation" of quantum physics.

List of mathematical tools 

Part of the folklore of the subject concerns the mathematical physics textbook Methods of Mathematical Physics put together by Richard Courant from David Hilbert's Göttingen University courses. The story is told (by mathematicians) that physicists had dismissed the material as not interesting in the current research areas, until the advent of Schrödinger's equation. At that point it was realised that the mathematics of the new quantum mechanics was already laid out in it. It is also said that Heisenberg had consulted Hilbert about his matrix mechanics, and Hilbert observed that his own experience with infinite-dimensional matrices had derived from differential equations, advice which Heisenberg ignored, missing the opportunity to unify the theory as Weyl and Dirac did a few years later. Whatever the basis of the anecdotes, the mathematics of the theory was conventional at the time, whereas the physics was radically new.

The main tools include:

 linear algebra: complex numbers, eigenvectors, eigenvalues
 functional analysis: Hilbert spaces, linear operators, spectral theory
 differential equations: partial differential equations, separation of variables, ordinary differential equations, Sturm–Liouville theory, eigenfunctions
 harmonic analysis: Fourier transforms

Notes

References 
 J. von Neumann, Mathematical Foundations of Quantum Mechanics (1932), Princeton University Press, 1955. Reprinted in paperback form.
 H. Weyl, The Theory of Groups and Quantum Mechanics, Dover Publications, 1950.
 A. Gleason, Measures on the Closed Subspaces of a Hilbert Space, Journal of Mathematics and Mechanics, 1957.
 G. Mackey, Mathematical Foundations of Quantum Mechanics, W. A. Benjamin, 1963 (paperback reprint by Dover 2004).
 R. F. Streater and A. S. Wightman, PCT, Spin and Statistics and All That, Benjamin 1964 (Reprinted by Princeton University Press)
 R. Jost, The General Theory of Quantized Fields, American Mathematical Society, 1965.
 J. M. Jauch, Foundations of quantum mechanics, Addison-Wesley Publ. Cy., Reading, Massachusetts, 1968.
 G. Emch, Algebraic Methods in Statistical Mechanics and Quantum Field Theory, Wiley-Interscience, 1972.
 M. Reed and B. Simon, Methods of Mathematical Physics, vols I–IV, Academic Press 1972.
 T. S. Kuhn, Black-Body Theory and the Quantum Discontinuity, 1894–1912, Clarendon Press, Oxford and Oxford University Press, New York, 1978.
 D. Edwards, The Mathematical Foundations of Quantum Mechanics, Synthese, 42 (1979),pp. 1–70.
 R. Shankar, "Principles of Quantum Mechanics", Springer, 1980.
 E. Prugovecki, Quantum Mechanics in Hilbert Space, Dover, 1981.
 S. Auyang, How is Quantum Field Theory Possible?, Oxford University Press, 1995.
 N. Weaver, Mathematical Quantization, Chapman & Hall/CRC 2001.
 G. Giachetta, L. Mangiarotti, G. Sardanashvily, Geometric and Algebraic Topological Methods in Quantum Mechanics, World Scientific, 2005.
 D. McMahon, Quantum Mechanics Demystified, 2nd Ed., McGraw-Hill Professional, 2005.
 G. Teschl, Mathematical Methods in Quantum Mechanics with Applications to Schrödinger Operators, https://www.mat.univie.ac.at/~gerald/ftp/book-schroe/, American Mathematical Society, 2009.
 V. Moretti, Spectral Theory and Quantum Mechanics: Mathematical Foundations of Quantum Theories, Symmetries and Introduction to the Algebraic Formulation, 2nd Edition, Springer, 2018.
 B. C. Hall, Quantum Theory for Mathematicians, Springer, 2013.
 V. Moretti, Fundamental Mathematical Structures of Quantum Theory, Springer, 2019.
 K. Landsman, Foundations of Quantum Theory, Springer 2017

 
Mathematical physics
History of physics